NGC 3300 is a lenticular galaxy in the constellation Leo. It was discovered by the astronomer William Herschel on 19 March 1784.

NGC 3300 is a LINER-type galaxy.

References

External links 

Leo (constellation)
3300
Lenticular galaxies
LINER galaxies